Interlink may refer to:
Hyperlinks
Interlink Electronics
Interlink (interbank network)
Interlink Airlines
Interlink Publishing
B-Train road trains in southern Africa
T. F. Green Airport (MBTA station), in Warwick, Rhode Island, US
Interlink Computer Sciences
Interlink, former trading name for a European parcel company, now owned by DPDgroup
INTERLNK, a DOS application